Lightridge High School is a public high school in Aldie, Virginia. Lightridge is within the jurisdiction of Loudoun County Public Schools. The school was opened at the beginning of the 2020–21 school year.

History 
The name “Lightridge” was chosen to recognize the history of agriculture and dairy farming in the area. The school is located off Lightridge Farm Road and near the site of Lightridge Farm, a now-closed dairy farm which operated for more than 60 years and was the last working dairy farm in Loudoun County east of Route 15.

The land was originally owned by the Hovatter Family, who continued their farming operations up until 2017, when the land was purchased to begin construction on both Lightridge High School and the adjacent Hovatter Elementary School, which opened at the beginning of the 2021-2022 school year.

When the school opened in 2020, the COVID-19 pandemic was still ongoing, and therefore had to begin the year entirely virtual. There also was no senior class at the school that year, meaning the only grades taught that year were 9, 10, and 11.

Rivalry 
Lightridge High School currently has three rivals: Rock Ridge High School, John Champe High School and Independence High School.

Enrollment History

References 

Northern Virginia
Schools in Loudoun County, Virginia